The Leonardo, located in downtown Salt Lake City, Utah, United States is a science and art museum where visitors can explore the ways that science, technology, art, and creativity connect. The museum opened its doors on October 8, 2011.

The educational philosophy of the museum is inspired by the Renaissance figure Leonardo da Vinci because of his willingness to follow his curiosity and his general belief that the arts and sciences were a part of the same enterprise. The museum is founded on the idea that Leonardo's approach is even more relevant today, as it has become harder to synthesize the incredible amount of information available to us in the modern age.

The Leonardo is run by a board of directors and an internal staff.

See also
 List of museums in Utah

References

External links

 

2011 establishments in Utah
Buildings and structures in Salt Lake City
Museums in Salt Lake City
Science museums in Utah